FHL may refer to:

 Fachhochschule Lübeck, a German university
 Familial hemophagocytic lymphohistiocytosis
 Family History Library, a genealogical research facility in Salt Lake City, Utah, United States
 Federal Hockey League, an American ice hockey league
 Federal Hockey League (Canada), a defunct Canadian ice hockey league
 Flexor hallucis longus muscle
 Friday Harbor Laboratories, a marine biology field station of the University of Washington